Babyninsky District is an administrative and municipal district (raion), one of the twenty-four in Kaluga Oblast, Russia. It is located in the center of the oblast. Its administrative center is the rural locality (a settlement) of Babynino. Population:   22,143 (2002 Census);  The population of Babynino accounts for 18.5% of the district's total population.

Geography   
Babyninsky District is located in the center of Kaluga Oblast, on flat terrain.  The district is immediately west of the city of Kaluga, and about 180 km southwest of Moscow.  The M3 Moscow-Ukraine Highway runs diagonally through the middle of the district, and the Old Smolensk Road runs across the north.  The area measures 35 km (north-south), and 35 km (west-east).  The administrative center is the town of Babynino.

The district is bordered on the north by Yukhnovsky District, on the east by Peremyshlsky District and the city of Kaluga, on the south by Kozelsky District, and on the west by Meshchovsky District.

References

Notes

Sources

External links
Babyninsky District on Google Maps
Babyninsky District on OpenStreetMap

Districts of Kaluga Oblast

